King Xuan of Chu (died 340 BC) was from 369 to 340 BC the king of the state of Chu during the Warring States period of ancient China.  He was born Xiong Liangfu and King Xuan was his posthumous title.

King Xuan succeeded his older brother King Su of Chu, who died without issue in 370 BC. Under his reign, Chu sent troops to help rescue the State of Zhao against an invasion by the State of Wei in 354 BC.

King Xuan died in 340 BC after 30 years of reign, and was succeeded by his son King Wei of Chu.

References

Monarchs of Chu (state)
Chinese kings
4th-century BC Chinese monarchs
340 BC deaths
Year of birth unknown